The Border Collie is a breed of herding dog of medium size. Widely considered to be the most intelligent dog breed, they are descended from landrace sheepdogs once found all over the British Isles, but became standardised in the Anglo-Scottish border region. They are now mostly used as working dogs to herd livestock, specifically sheep.

Border Collies are extremely energetic, acrobatic, and athletic. They frequently compete with great success in sheepdog trials and a range of dog sports like dog obedience, disc dog, herding and dog agility. Border Collies continue to be employed in their traditional work of herding livestock throughout the world and are kept as pets.

Description

In general, Border Collies are medium-sized dogs with a moderate amount of coat, which is more often thick and prone to shedding. They have a double coat that varies from smooth to rough and is occasionally curled. While black and white is the most commonly seen colour pattern of the Border Collie, the breed appears in just about any colour and pattern known to occur in dogs. Some of these include black tricolour (black/tan/white), liver and white, and red tricolour (red/tan/white) which have also been seen regularly, and other colours such as blue, lilac, red merle, blue merle, brindle, and Australian red (also known as ee red, blonde, recessive red, or gold) which is seen less frequently. Some border collies may also have single-colour coats.

Eye colour varies from brown to green, and occasionally eyes of differing colour occur; this is usually seen with merles. This trait is known as heterochromia. The ears of the border collie are also variable — some have fully erect ears, some fully dropped ears, and others semi-erect ears (similar to those of the rough collie). Although working border collie handlers sometimes have superstitions about the appearance of their dogs (handlers may avoid mostly white dogs due to the unfounded idea that sheep will not respect a white or almost all white dog), in general, the American Border Collie Association considers a dog's appearance to be irrelevant. Instead, it is considered more useful to identify a working border collie by its attitude and ability.

Dogs bred for show are more homogeneous in appearance than working border collies since to win in conformation showing they must conform closely to breed club standards that are specific on many points of the structure, coat, and colour. Kennel clubs specify, for example, that the border collie must have a "keen and intelligent" expression, and that the preferred eye colour is dark brown. In deference to the dog's working origin, scars and broken teeth received in the line of duty are not to be counted against a border collie in the show ring.

Temperament and needs

Border Collies require considerably more daily physical exercise and mental stimulation than many other breeds. The border collie is widely considered to be the most intelligent dog breed. The border collie ranks 1st in Stanley Coren's The Intelligence of Dogs, being part of the top 10 brightest dogs. Although the primary role of the border collie is to herd livestock, the breed is becoming increasingly popular as a companion animal.

In this role, due to their working heritage, border collies are very demanding, playful, and energetic. They thrive best in households that can provide them with plenty of play and exercise, either with humans or other dogs. Due to their demanding personalities and need for mental stimulation and exercise, many border collies develop problematic behaviours in households that are not able to provide for their needs. They are infamous for chewing holes in walls and furniture, and for destructive scraping and hole digging, due to boredom. Border collies may exhibit a strong desire to herd, a trait they may show with small children, cats, and other dogs. The breed's herding trait has been deliberately encouraged, as it was in the dogs from which the border collie was developed, by selective breeding for many generations. However, being eminently trainable, they can live amicably with other pets if given proper socialisation training.

The American Border Collie Association recommends that potential owners, before taking on the breed as a household pet, should be sure they can provide regular exercise commensurate with the collie's high energy and prodigious stamina. A working collie may run many miles a day, using its experience, personality, and intelligence to control challenging livestock. These dogs will become distressed and frustrated if left in isolation, ignored or inactive. Like many working breeds, border collies can be motion-sensitive and may chase moving vehicles and bicycles, but this behaviour can be modified by training. Some of the more difficult behaviours require patience, as they are developmental and may disappear as the dog matures.

Health

Life span

The natural life span of the border collie is between 12 and 15 years, with an average lifespan of 12 years and the ability to live up to 18 years. The median longevities of breeds of similar size are usually 12 to 13 years. 

Leading causes of death are cancer (23.6%), old age (17.9%) and cerebral vascular afflictions (9.4%). Additional causes of death are 

 Collie eye anomaly
 Hip dysplasia
 Epilepsy
 Hearing loss
 Elbow dysplasia
 Addison Disease

Common health problems
Collie eye anomaly (CEA) and epilepsy are considered the primary genetic diseases of concern in the breed at this time.

CEA is a congenital, inherited eye disease involving the retina, choroid, and sclera that sometimes affects border collies. In border collies, it is generally a mild disease and rarely significantly impairs vision. However, other eye conditions such as PRA slowly disintegrates the retina and can cause border collies to lose almost all of their vision at night which can progress into complete daytime blindness. There is now a DNA test available for CEA and, through its use, breeders can ensure that they will not produce affected pups.

There are different types of hip testing available including OFA (Orthopedic Foundation for Animals) and PennHip. Radiographs are taken and sent to these organisations to determine a dog's hip and elbow quality.

Elbow dysplasia may also occur in the breed. Dogs homozygous for the merle gene, sometimes referred to as "double merles", are likely to have sight and/or hearing defects.

Two types of hearing loss occur in the breed. The first type is pigment associated and is found in border collie puppies, although the puppies can have congenital sensorineural deafness from birth as well. The second type is known as adult-onset hearing loss. These dogs have a normal auditory brainstem response test as pups but gradually lose their hearing some time between one and eight years of age. A study is currently underway at The Translational Genomics Research Institute to identify the genetic cause of adult-onset hearing loss in the breed.

Neuronal ceroid lipofuscinosis (NCL) is a rare but serious disease that is limited to show border collies. NCL results in severe neurological impairment and early death; afflicted dogs rarely survive beyond two years of age. The mutation causing the form of the disease found in border collies was identified by Scott Melville in the laboratory of Dr Alan Wilton of the School of Biotechnology and Biomolecular Sciences, University of New South Wales. There is no treatment or cure, but a DNA test is now available to detect carriers as well as affected dogs.

Trapped Neutrophil Syndrome (TNS) is a hereditary disease in which the bone marrow produces neutrophils (white cells) but is unable to effectively release them into the bloodstream. Affected puppies have an impaired immune system and will eventually die from infections they cannot fight. The mutation responsible for TNS has been found in border collies in English working dogs, in show dogs that had originated in Australia and New Zealand, and in unrelated Australian working dogs. This indicates that the gene is widespread and probably as old as the breed itself. TNS was identified by Jeremy Shearman in the laboratory of Dr Alan Wilton of the School of Biotechnology and Biomolecular Sciences, University of New South Wales. There is no cure, but a DNA test is now available to detect carriers as well as affected dogs.

Other diseases found less commonly include juvenile cataracts, osteochondritis, hypothyroidism, diabetes mellitus and canine cyclic neutropaenia, carpal soft-tissue injury.

A syndrome of exercise-induced collapse similar to that seen in Labrador retrievers, otherwise termed Border Collie Collapse and triggered by episodes of collapse associated with periods of intense exercise has been described in Border Collies in North America, Europe and Australia; and is currently the subject of further investigation. Border Collie Collapse or "the wobbles" is a disease found in many herding/working breeds. The cause is currently unknown. Border Collie Collapse seems to be related to high-intensity exercises that are found to be particularly exciting to the individual dog. For example, some dogs cannot retrieve a tennis ball, as they find this activity highly stimulating, but can run for several miles with no symptoms of Border Collie Collapse. Symptoms commonly include disorientation, mental dullness, loss of attention, unsteady hind legs, dragging of hind legs, and ultimately the need to sit or lie down. Loss of consciousness and seizure-like trembling/spasms are not characteristics of Border Collie Collapse. There is no current diagnostic test or veterinary workup that can confirm Border Collie Collapse and the diagnosis is often given as a diagnosis of exclusion or based on clinical symptoms. There is no current treatment recommended, and it is advised to limit the episodes by avoiding the activities that trigger the collapse.

History

The border collie is descended from landrace collies, a type found widely in the British Isles. The name for the breed came from its probable place of origin along the Anglo-Scottish border. Mention of the "collie" or "Colley" type first appeared toward the end of the 19th century, although the word "collie" is older than this and has its origin in the Scots language. It is also thought that the word 'collie' comes from the old Celtic word for useful. Many of the best border collies today can be traced back to a dog known as Old Hemp.

In 1915, James Reid, Secretary of the International Sheep Dog Society (ISDS) in the United Kingdom first used the term "border collie" to distinguish those dogs registered by the ISDS from the Kennel Club's collie (or Scotch collie, including the rough collie and smooth collie) which originally came from the same working stock but had developed a different, standardised appearance following introduction to the show ring in 1860 and mixture with different breeds.

Old Hemp

 Old Hemp, a tricolour dog, was born in Northumberland, England in September 1893 and died in May 1901. He was bred by Adam Telfer from Roy, a black and tan dog, and Meg, a black-coated, strong-eyed dog. Hemp was a quiet, powerful dog to which sheep responded easily. Many shepherds used him for stud and Hemp's working style became the Border Collie style. All pure border collies alive today can trace an ancestral line back to Old Hemp. He was believed to have sired as many as 200 pups over the span of his life.

Wiston Cap
Wiston Cap (b. 28 September 1963) is the dog that the International Sheep Dog Society (ISDS) badge portrays in the characteristic border collie herding pose. He was a popular stud dog in the history of the breed, and his bloodline can be seen in most bloodlines of the modern-day collie. Bred by W. S. Hetherington and trained and handled by John Richardson, Cap was a biddable and good-natured dog. His bloodlines all trace back to the early registered dogs of the studbook, and to J. M. Wilson's Cap, whose name occurs 16 times within seven generations in his pedigree. Wiston Cap sired three Supreme Champions and is grand-sire of three others, one of whom was E. W. Edwards' Bill, who won the championship twice.

Introduction to New Zealand and Australia
Collies were listed as imports to New Zealand as early as 1858, but the type was not specified. In the late 1890s James Lilico (1861?–1945) of Christchurch, New Zealand, imported a number of working dogs from the United Kingdom. These included Hindhope Jed, a black, tan and white born in Hindhope, Scotland in 1895, as well as Maudie, Moss of Ancrum, Ness and Old Bob.

It is unclear whether Hindhope Jed was a descendant of Old Hemp. Born two years after him, she is mentioned in a British Hunts and Huntsmen article concerning a Mr John Elliot of Jedburgh:

Mr. Elliot himself is well known for his breed of collies. His father supplied Noble to the late Queen Victoria and it was from our subject that the McLeod got Hindhope Jed, now the champion of New Zealand and Australia.

When her departure to New Zealand, Hindhope Jed was already in pup to Captain, another of the then-new "border" strain. Hindhope Jed had won three trials in her native Scotland, and was considered to be the "best to cross the equator".

In 1901 the King and Mcleod stud was created by Charles Beechworth King (b. 1855, Murrumbidgee, NSW), his brother and Alec McLeod at Canonbar, near Nyngan (north-west of Sydney), brought Hindhope Jed to Australia, where she enjoyed considerable success at sheepdog trials.

The New Zealand Heading Dog breed was developed from Border Collies.

Breed standards

There are two types of tests, or standards, to determine the breeding quality of a Border Collie: the original ISDS sheepdog trial and appearance.

ISDS sheepdog trial
The original test is the ISDS sheepdog trial. It is still used today, where a dog and handler collect groups of livestock and move them quietly around a course. There are certain standard elements to this test depending on the level: national or international. For both levels, sheep must be gathered as calmly as possible without being distressed. For a national competition, normally held between England, Ireland, Scotland, and Wales, trials run over a 400-yard course. International courses use a 400-yard course for the qualifying trials, but on the third and final day, trials are held in a course of 800 yards.

The international test involves a "double fetch", where the sheepdog must gather 10 sheep from 800 yards away, bring them on an angle to the centre of the field, and then be sent back in another direction to gather another 10 sheep, also placed 800 yards from the handler. Five of those 20 sheep will have collars on, and at the end of a triangular drive, the sheep are gathered into a circular "shedding ring" and the 15 sheep without collars are driven away as the five collared sheep are kept inside the ring and then penned. Sheepdogs must be directed through obstacles at varying distance from the handler, and then the dog must demonstrate the ability to do work close at hand by penning the sheep and sorting them out.

Appearance

In nearly every region of the world, the border collie is now also a breed that is shown in a ring or bench shows. For the people who participate in these events, the Border Collie is defined by the breed standard, which is a description of how the dog should look. In New Zealand and Australia, where the breed has been shown throughout most of the twentieth century, the Border Collie standards have produced a dog with a long double coat (smooth coats are allowed), a soft dark eye, a body slightly longer than tall, a well-defined stop, semi-pricked ears, as well as a gentle and friendly temperament. This style of Border Collie has become popular in winning show kennels around the world, as well as among prestigious judges. Breed standards state that its tail must be slightly curved and must stop at the hock. The fur must be lush. It should show good expression in its eyes and must be intelligent. It is energetic with most commonly a black and white coat (sometimes brown). It should have a powerful herding instinct.

Criticism of show dog conformity based on appearance
Other enthusiasts oppose the use of border collies as show dogs, for fear that breeding for appearance will lead to a decline in the breed's working dog traits. Few handlers of working Border Collies participate in conformation shows, as working dogs are bred to a performance standard rather than an appearance standard. Likewise, conformation-bred dogs are seldom seen on the sheepdog trial field, except in Kennel Club-sponsored events. Dogs registered with either working or conformation-based registries are seen in other performance events such as agility, obedience, tracking or flyball; however, these dogs do not necessarily conform to the breed standard of appearance as closely as the dogs shown in the breed rings as this is not a requirement in performance events, nor do they necessarily participate in herding activities.

Registries

United Kingdom
There are two separate registries for border collies in the UK. The International Sheep Dog Society encourages breeding for herding ability, whereas the Kennel Club (UK) encourages breeding for a standardised appearance. The ISDS registry is by far the older of the two, and ISDS dogs are eligible for registration as pedigree Border Collies with the Kennel Club (KC) — but not vice versa. The only way for a Border Collie without an ISDS pedigree to be added to the ISDS registry is by proving its worth as a herding dog so that it can be Registered on Merit (ROM).

United States

Two of the principal registries for border collies in the United States are the American Border Collie Association (ABCA) and the National Border Collie Association (NBCA), both of which are dedicated to the preservation of the traditional working dog. The breed was also recognised in 1995 by the American Kennel Club (AKC) after occupying the AKC's Miscellaneous Class for over 50 years. The recognition was under protest from the majority of border collie affiliated groups, such as the United States Border Collie Club, which felt that emphasis on the breed's working skills would be lost under AKC recognition. AKC registrations have gradually increased since recognition and by 2004 there were 1,984 new AKC registrations of border collies, with a further 2,378 for the year 2005. By contrast, the American Border Collie Association registers approximately 20,000 border collies annually. Because of the inherent tension between the goals of breeding to a working standard and to an appearance standard, the American Border Collie Association voted in 2003 that dogs who attained a conformation championship would be delisted from the ABCA registry, regardless of ability. Cross-registration is allowed between the working registries, and AKC accepts dogs registered with ABCA, NASDS, and NBCA. but none of the working registries in the U.S. honours AKC pedigrees, with the exception of the NBCA which will accept a transfer of registration from AKC.

Australia
In Australia, Border collies are registered with an Australian National Kennel Council (ANKC) affiliated state control body or with a working dog registry. Between 2,011 and 2,701 ANKC pedigreed border collies have been registered with the ANKC each year since 1986. Inclusion on the ANKC affiliate's main register allows border collies to compete in conformation, obedience, agility, tracking, disc dog, herding and other ANKC-sanctioned events held by an ANKC affiliated club, while inclusion on the limited register prohibits entry in conformation events. The ANKC provides a breed standard; however, this applies to conformation events only and has no influence on dogs entering performance events. Non-ANKC pedigreed dogs may also be eligible for inclusion on an ANKC associate or sporting register and be able to compete in ANKC performance or herding events. Agility organisations such as the Agility Dog Association of Australia (ADAA) have their own registry which allows the inclusion of any dog wishing to compete in their events.

Canada
In Canada, Agriculture Canada has recognised the Canadian Border Collie Association as the registry under the Animal Pedigree Act for any border collie that is designated as a "Pure Breed" in Canada.

The criteria used are based on herding lineage rather than appearance. It is a two-tiered registry in that dogs imported that are registered with a foreign Kennel Club that does hold conformation shows are given a "B" registration, whereas those that come directly from other working registries are placed on the "A" registry.

Recently, the Canadian Kennel Club has polled its members to decide if border collies should be included on the CKC "Miscellaneous List". This designation would allow border collie owners the ability to compete in all CKC events, but the CKC would not be the registering body. People who compete in performance events support the move. The CBCA is against this designation.

South Africa
The registration of working sheepdogs in South Africa is the responsibility of the South African Sheepdog Association. ISDS-registered dogs imported into the country can be transferred onto the SASDA register. Dogs not registered can become eligible for registration by being awarded a certificate of working ability by a registered judge. Occasionally they will facilitate the testing of dogs used for breeding, for hip dysplasia and collie eye anomaly, to encourage the breeding of dogs without these genetic flaws.

Turkey
The registration of working border collies in Turkey is the province of the Border Collie Dernegi (Turkish Border Collie Association) established in 2007.

Elsewhere
The border collie breed is also recognised as the prime sheepdog by the International Stock Dog Federation (ISDF), based in Piccadilly, London, UK.

Activities
Border collies are one of the most popular breeds for dog agility competitions. They also excel at competitive obedience, showmanship, flyball, tracking, and sheepdog trials and herding events.

Livestock work

Working border collies can take direction by voice and by whistle at long distances when herding. Their great energy and herding instinct are still used to herd a variety of animals, from the traditional sheep and cattle, to free-range poultry, pigs, and ostriches. They are also used to remove unwanted wild birds from airport runways, golf courses, and other public and private areas.

Shepherds in the UK have taken the most critical elements of herding and incorporated them into a sheepdog trial. The first recorded sheepdog trials were held in Bala, North Wales, in 1873. These competitions enable farmers and shepherds to evaluate possible mates for their working dogs, but they have developed a sport aspect as well, with competitors from outside the farming community also taking part.

In the US, the national sanctioning body for these competitions is the USBCHA. In the UK it is the International Sheep Dog Society, in Canada the Canadian Border Collie Association (CBCA) and in South Africa it is the South African Sheepdog Association.

Dog sports
Border collies excel at several dog sports in addition to their success in sheepdog trials due to their high instinct for herding. Herding instincts and trainability can be tested when introduced to sheep or at noncompetitive instinct tests. Border collies exhibiting basic herding instincts can be trained to compete in sheepdog trials and other herding events. They perform well at some higher jump heights at dog agility competitions, so much so that in England, competitions often include classes for ABC dogs, "Anything But Collies".

The border collie's speed, agility, and stamina have allowed them to dominate in dog activities like flyball and disc dog competitions. Their trainability has also given them a berth in dog dancing competitions.

Border collies have a highly developed sense of smell and with their high drive make excellent and easily motivated tracking dogs for tracking trials. These trials simulate the finding of a lost person in a controlled situation where the performance of the dog can be evaluated, with titles awarded for successful dogs. Border Collies are used as search dogs in mountain rescue in Britain. They are particularly useful for searching large areas of hillside and avalanche debris. Hamish MacInnes believed that dark-coated dogs are less prone to snow blindness.

Research
The impressive intelligence of the Border Collie has made it a viable subject for research. In particular, the Georgia Institute of Technology’s FIDO (Facilitating Interactions for Dogs with Occupations) project demonstrated the ability of intelligent dogs to communicate with humans. In particular, Professor Melody Jackson, director of the Institute’s BrainLab, instrumented a Border Collie named Sky to activate a sensor worn by the dog which allowed Sky to communicate in audible English with its handler. One intent was to allow service dogs to warn their owners of impending danger, or to alert others to emergency situations involving their handler, especially those situations which might have resulted in the incapacitation of their handler.

Notable Border Collies

 Rico, who was studied for recognising up to 200 objects by name. Another border collie, Betsy, was found to have a vocabulary of over 300 words.
 Chaser had a vocabulary of 1,022 words, could reason by exclusion, and could recognise objects by the groups they belong to.
 Shep, who was the long-term companion to John Noakes of the BBC's Blue Peter and Meg, companion of Matt Baker, former presenter of the same show.
 Shep was also a dog that appeared at a railway station in 1936 and watched his dead master be loaded onto a train. He remained there, waiting for his master to return, for the next five and a half years. 
 Striker, who is the current Guinness World Record holder for "Fastest Car Window Opened by a Dog" at 11.34 seconds.
 Jean, also known as the Vitagraph Dog, who was the first canine movie star (owned and trained by Laurence Trimble).
 Bandit, the stray Scottish Border Collie from the TV series Little House on the Prairie was Laura Ingalls' second dog on the show.
 Peggy, awarded the PDSA Certificate for Animal Bravery or Devotion.
 Sheila, the first civilian dog ever awarded the PDSA Dicken medal, for her part in rescuing the crew of a B-17 Flying Fortress, which crashed into the Cheviot Hills, Northumberland.
 Mike the Dog, appeared in TV and film including Down and Out in Beverly Hills.
 Finn, companion of Tank Museum curator David Willey, and co-star of the museum's Q&A with Curator David Willey YouTube series.
 Frankie, subject of a viral Instagram video.
 Mr. Pickles is the titular protagonist and the Goodman family's pet border collie, the physical embodiment of the Devil and who loves to eat pickles.

See also

 List of dog breeds
 McNab dog
 Rough Collie
 Smooth Collie
 Australian Shepherd
 Cumberland Sheepdog
 English Shepherd
 Shetland Sheepdog
 Welsh Sheepdog

References

External links

 

Dog breeds originating in the United Kingdom
FCI breeds
Herding dogs